Ken Rosewall won the singles title of the 1971 World Championship Tennis Finals with a 6–4, 1–6, 7–6(7–3), 7–6(7–4) victory in the final against Rod Laver.

Seeds
A champion seed is indicated in bold text while text in italics indicates the round in which that seed was eliminated.

Draw

References

External links
 ITF tournament edition details

Singles